Christopher Parker Washington (born March 21, 2002) is an American football wide receiver for the Penn State Nittany Lions. Washington attended and played football for Fort Bend Travis High School in Texas, where he was ranked as a four star prospect by 247Sports. He entered his true freshman season as a starter at wide receiver, and started every game of the 2020 season for the Nittany Lions. He is the cousin of Titans quarterback Joshua Dobbs.

Early life and high school career
Washington attended Fort Bend Travis High School, in Richmond, Texas. Washington was a multisport athlete. He played baseball, basketball and football. Washington played varsity for the three years he played football at Fort Bend Travis. As a freshman (2016–17) Washington had 30 receptions for 400 yards and 4 receiving touchdowns, and 1 rushing touchdown, for 5 total touchdowns. As a junior (2018–19) Washington had 75 receptions for 1500 yards and 18 receiving touchdowns, 3 rushing touchdowns and 1 passing touchdown, for a total of 22 touchdowns. As a senior (2019–20), Washington had 54 receptions for 900 yards and 14 receiving touchdowns. He had 160 receptions, 2800 receiving yards, 3000 total yards, 36 receiving touchdowns, and 41 total touchdowns for his high school career.

College career
As a freshman at Penn State, Washington started all nine games for the Nittany Lions. He became the first true freshman since Brandon Polk in 2015 to start the season opener for the Nittany Lions. On October 24, 2020, in Penn State's season-opener against Indiana, Washington caught his first career touchdown to give the Nittany Lions a lead in overtime. Against Maryland, Washington caught two touchdown passes and earned the coaching staff's Offensive Player of the Week. Against Michigan, Washington had 9 receptions for 93 yards. Two weeks later, against Michigan State, he set a new career high with 95 receiving yards and two touchdowns

Washington had 36 receptions for 500 yards and 6 receiving touchdowns as a true freshman, and was named a Second-Team Freshman All-American by The Athletic. He ranked first among Big Ten freshmen in receptions, yards, and touchdowns.

Statistics

References

External links
Penn State Nittany Lions bio

Penn State Nittany Lions football players
American football wide receivers
People from Richmond, Texas
Living people
Year of birth missing (living people)